The Horde is a 2009 French horror film co-written and directed by Yannick Dahan and Benjamin Rocher. It stars Claude Perron, Jean-Pierre Martins, Eriq Ebouaney and Aurélien Recoing.

Plot
A group of French policemen embark on a mission of vengeance after a colleague is killed by a notorious drug dealer. He is holed up in a condemned high-rise in the heart of a derelict and corrupt Paris neighborhood (ZUP). They storm the social housing complex with the intent of taking him down, but the operation is a failure and the team is captured. Suddenly, both sides are confronted by an altogether different opponent, zombies. Cops and criminals must now forge an uneasy alliance to survive the undead onslaught.

Cast
Claude Perron as Aurore
Jean-Pierre Martins as Ouessem "Ouesse"
Eriq Ebouaney as Adewale Markudi
Yves Pignot as René
Doudou Masta as Bola Markudi
Jo Prestia as José
Antoine Oppenheim as Tony
Aurélien Recoing as Jimenez

Production
The film was shot in Paris, France in 2008 and released in 2009. The film was released in North America in 2010.

Release
The film premiered on August 28, 2009 in London as part of the London FrightFest Film Festival. It had a cinema release with 200 screens in France on February 10, 2010. In December 2009 IFC Films acquired the rights for the U.S. release. It was part of the Sitges Film Festival in 2009. The film had a limited U.S. theatrical release in August 2010.

Reception
The film won two Garner awards for the Best Screenplay and Best Special Effects or Cinematography at Fantasporto Film Festival.

The film received mixed reviews from critics. The film holds a 45% approval rating on Rotten Tomatoes, based on 20 critical reviews with an average rating of 4.81/10.

References

External links 
 
 

2009 films
2000s French-language films
2000s action horror films
Films set in Paris
French zombie films
Films shot in France
French action horror films
Films scored by Christopher Lennertz
2000s French films